20 South Second Street is a historic home located in Newport, Pennsylvania.

This is a two-story home with a hipped roof, resting on a stone foundation. The all brick structure is 4 pays wide with a storefront at the corner.  Clapboard siding was added around the storefront along with a wraparound porch with modern wood columns.

History 
Now home of Newport Natural Foods, I was home to the following businesses:  The William "Bill" Welfley Drug Store, Earl Gower Drug Store, Charles E. Bosserman Drug Store & Soda Fountain, State Liquor Store, the Post Office from 1922 to 1932, Fleck and Hyman Clothing, D. H. Spots Clothing, Marx Dukes Clothing.  Originally known as the Dr James B. Eby building

It was designated a contributing property of the Newport Historic District in 1999.
It is also identified as #71 in the

References 

Geography of Perry County, Pennsylvania
Second Empire architecture in Pennsylvania
Italianate architecture in Pennsylvania
Working-class culture in Pennsylvania
National Register of Historic Places in Perry County, Pennsylvania
Historic district contributing properties in Pennsylvania